Asagiri may refer to:

 Asagiri, Kumamoto, a town in Japan
 Japanese destroyer Asagiri, several ships
 Asagiri-class destroyer
 Asagiri (train), a Japanese limited express train 
 10157 Asagiri, an asteroid

People with the surname
, Japanese manga artist

Fictional characters
 Priscilla S. Asagiri, a character in the anime series, Bubblegum Crisis
, a character in the anime series, Gate Keepers
, a character in the anime series, Tamako Market
Aya Asagiri, a main character from the manga Magical Girl Site
, a main character from the manga Dr. Stone

Japanese-language surnames